is a Japanese professional baseball pitcher for the Yokohama DeNA BayStars of Nippon Professional Baseball (NPB).

Career
Yamasaki was drafted with the first pick by the Yokohama DeNA BayStars in 2014 Nippon Professional Baseball draft. He has been selected as an all-star five times in his career.

International career
Yamasaki was selected for the Japan national baseball team at the 2015 WBSC Premier12.

On August 20, 2018, he was selected to be on the Samurai Japan Roster for the 2018 MLB Japan All-Star Series.

On February 27, 2019, he was selected for the Japan national baseball team at the 2019 exhibition games against Mexico.

On October 1, 2019, he was again selected for the Japan national team at the 2019 WBSC Premier12.

Personal life
Yamasaki has a Japanese father and a Filipino mother
her mother name

References

External links

 Yasuaki Yamasaki on NPB.com
 

1992 births
Living people
Asia University (Japan) alumni
Japanese people of Filipino descent
Nippon Professional Baseball pitchers
Nippon Professional Baseball Rookie of the Year Award winners
People from Arakawa, Tokyo
Baseball people from Tokyo
Yokohama DeNA BayStars players
2015 WBSC Premier12 players
2019 WBSC Premier12 players
Baseball players at the 2020 Summer Olympics
Olympic baseball players of Japan
Olympic medalists in baseball
Olympic gold medalists for Japan
Medalists at the 2020 Summer Olympics